Philipp Simon (born 10 January 1994) is a German footballer who plays as a midfielder for 1. FC Düren.

Career
Simon made his professional debut for Alemannia Aachen in the 3. Liga on 16 March 2013, coming on as a substitute in the 55th minute for Dario Schumacher in the 1–4 away loss against Preußen Münster.

References

External links
 Profile at DFB.de
 Profile at kicker.de
 FC 08 Düren-Niederau statistics at Fussball.de

1994 births
Living people
People from Düren
Sportspeople from Cologne (region)
Footballers from North Rhine-Westphalia
German footballers
Association football midfielders
Alemannia Aachen players
3. Liga players
Regionalliga players
Oberliga (football) players